The Jerry Garcia Acoustic Band (JGAB) was a  band formed by Jerry Garcia of the Grateful Dead.  They played a number of  concerts in 1987 and 1988, and subsequently released two  live albums.

Band members
Jerry Garcia - guitar, vocals
David Nelson - guitar, vocals
Sandy Rothman - mandolin, dobro, banjo, vocals
John Kahn - bass
Kenny Kosek - fiddle
David Kemper - drums

History
Garcia and Rothman had played together in The Black Mountain Boys, a bluegrass band. The JGAB formed in 1987 and made their first public appearance at The Fillmore on March 18, 1987 at a benefit concert for Artist Rights Today.

The JGAB played the Lunt-Fontanne Theatre for a two-week Broadway run, then continued with appearances at The Warfield in San Francisco and the Wiltern Theatre in Los Angeles. Other performances included the Electric on the Eel concert, the Creating a Better Future benefit in Marin County, California, as well as appearances at the Cotati Cabaret (an exclusive club in Sonoma County, California), and the Frost Amphitheater at Stanford University.

Discography

Almost Acoustic – 1988
Pure Jerry: Lunt-Fontanne, New York City, October 31, 1987 – two CDs by the Jerry Garcia Band and two CDs by the Jerry Garcia Acoustic Band – 2004
Pure Jerry: Lunt-Fontanne, New York City, The Best of the Rest, October 15–30, 1987 – two CDs by the Jerry Garcia Band and one CD by the Jerry Garcia Acoustic Band – 2004
 Ragged but Right – 2010
On Broadway: Act One – October 28th, 1987 – two CDs by the Jerry Garcia Acoustic Band and one CD by the Jerry Garcia Band – 2015
Electric on the Eel – six CDs by the Jerry Garcia Band and one CD bonus disc by the Jerry Garcia Acoustic Band – 2019

Selection of songs performed
Swing Low Sweet Chariot
Diamond Joe
I'm Here To Get My Baby Out Of Jail
Deep Elem Blues
I'm Troubled
Oh, The Wind and Rain
Oh Babe, It Ain't No Lie
Ripple
I've Been All Around This World
The Girl At The Crossroads Bar
The Ballad of Casey Jones (A song written by Mississippi John Hurt, not to be confused with the Grateful Dead's own song "Casey Jones")
Gone Home
Blue Yodel
Spike Driver Blues
Trouble In Mind
I Ain't Never
Short Life Of Trouble
Ragged But Right
Drifting With The Tide
Rosa Lee McFall
Two Soldiers
If I Lose
Bright Morning Star
Goodnight Irene
(It's A Long, Long Way) To The Top Of The World
Drifting Too Far From The Shore
Turtle Dove
Ashes Of Love
Poison Love
Friend Of The Devil
Little Sadie

References

1987 establishments in California
1988 disestablishments in California
Rock music groups from California
Jerry Garcia
Musical groups established in 1987
Musical groups disestablished in 1988